Kim Clijsters was the defending champion but did not compete that year.

Rita Grande won in the final 0–6, 6–3, 6–3 against Jennifer Hopkins.

Seeds
A champion seed is indicated in bold text while text in italics indicates the round in which that seed was eliminated.

  Amy Frazier (quarterfinals)
  Elena Likhovtseva (quarterfinals)
  Kristina Brandi (quarterfinals)
  Anne-Gaëlle Sidot (quarterfinals)
  Cara Black (semifinals)
  Ruxandra Dragomir (semifinals)
  Anna Smashnova (second round)
  Sarah Pitkowski (first round)

Draw

Qualifying

Seeds
  Els Callens (first round)
  Amanda Hopmans (final round)
  Yvette Basting (final round)
  Anabel Medina Garrigues (Qualifier)

Qualifiers

  Saori Obata
  Katarina Srebotnik
  Stéphanie Foretz
  Anabel Medina Garrigues

Draw

First qualifier

Second qualifier

Third qualifier

Fourth qualifier

References
 2001 ANZ Tasmanian International Draw

Hobart International – Singles
Singles